Bajhakhet  is a village development committee in Lamjung District in the Gandaki Zone of northern-central Nepal. At the time of the 1991 Nepal census it had a population of 3177 people living in 625 individual households.

Media
To Promote local culture Bajhakhet has one FM radio station Radio Marsyangdi - 95.0 MHz Which is a Community radio Station.

References

External links
UN map of the municipalities of Lamjung District

Populated places in Lamjung District